V. Selvaganesh is an Indian percussionist working in the Carnatic tradition and one of the leading kanjira (south Indian frame drum) players of his generation. He is also known as "Chella S. Ganesh."

Career
Selvaganesh gained world fame through tours with John McLaughlin's group, Remember Shakti. He helps his father, Grammy-Nominated T.H. "Vikku" Vinayakram, to run the Sri JGTV school and train a new generation of Carnatic percussionists. He has also composed and produced albums and played with the Swedish bass player Jonas Hellborg and American guitar virtuoso Shawn Lane.

In 2012, Selvaganesh made his film directorial debut with Bodhai, a short film in Tamil. He also composed the four-track soundtrack which was released in digital format by Saregama.

Film career
V. Selvaganesh made his debut composing for films with the Tamil movie Vennila Kabadi Kuzhu (2008).

Discography
 Solo Albums
 Soukha (2006)
 Kanjourney (2016)
 With Jonas Hellborg
 Good People in Times of Evil (2000)
 Icon: A Transcontinental Gathering (2003)
 Kali's Son (2006)
 Art Metal (2007)
 With John Mclaughlin
 Remember Shakti - The Believer (2000)
 Remember Shakti – Saturday Night in Bombay (2001)

 As film composer
 Vennila Kabadi Kuzhu (2008)
 Kola Kolaya Mundhirika (2009)
 Drohi (2010)
 Nil Gavani Sellathey (2010)
 Bheemili Kabaddi Jattu (2010)
 Kullanari Koottam (2011)
 Pilla Zamindar (2011) (Telugu)
 Shiva Manasulo Shruti (2012) (Telugu)
 Nirnayam (2013) (also producer)
 Rettai Vaalu (2013)
 Arthanari (2016)
Chitrangada (2017) (Telugu)
 Vennila Kabaddi Kuzhu 2 (2019)

References

External links

 

1966 births
Indian percussionists
Living people
Tamil film score composers
Tamil musicians
Place of birth missing (living people)
Ghatam players
Art Metal (band) members
Remember Shakti members
Telugu film score composers